The Australian Sailing Museum was a privately operated museum in Mandurah, Western Australia, which opened in 2008 and closed in 2012.

Owned and built by Rolly Tasker, the Australian Sailing Museum exhibited a comprehensive display of yacht models, the history of Australian sailing, and sailors, from the 19th century. It hosted maritime artworks, lifelike wax figures of sailing icons (a saluting Dennis Conner, John Cox Stevens, Sir Thomas Lipton & more), while the main exhibition area was circled with pennants from clubs around the world. The Museum also housed the Peninsula Art Gallery which sold prints, the Boardwalk coffee shop and Rolly Tasker Sails Australia which offered sails made by Rolly.

The opening address on Monday 7 April 2008 was made by Major General Michael Jeffery AC CVO MC, Governor-General of the Commonwealth of Australia, who opened the museum on Rolly and Kerry Tasker's behalf.

The Museum housed an extensive array of built-to-scale model yachts in glass cases. The models were representative of most of the Australian and many international classes of yachts. The Australian sailing and Olympic sailing champions' achievements were listed. Wax figures circled the centre of the Museum while sailing history in text and pictures lined the walls.

It was listed as a 2009 WA Tourism Awards Finalist.

Following the death of Rolly Tasker at the age of 86 in 2012, and after failing to find an organisation to take over the collection, his family transferred many of the contents to the WA Museum and Fremantle Maritime Museum, while others were sold at auction.

References

External links
 Australian Sailing Museum
 Museum Register
 Mandurah Mail article on Museum opening
 Sail World article on the Australian Sailing Museum
 Experience Perth

Maritime museums in Australia
Sailing in Australia
Museums in Western Australia
Mandurah